Rings of Saturn is a 1981 video game published by Level-10 for the Apple II.

Contents
Rings of Saturn is game in which the player captains the spaceship Goya, and is expected to fly through the "A Ring" of Saturn, rescue the crew of a crippled ship, and bring them back to base.

Reception
Forrest Johnson reviewed Rings of Saturn in The Space Gamer No. 46. Johnson commented that "Rings of Saturn is an innovative game, and it will have novelty value for the arcade denizen."

References

External links

Softalk reviews

1981 video games
Apple II games
Apple II-only games
Fiction set on Saturn
Level-10 games
Rings of Saturn in fiction
Single-player video games
Video games developed in the United States